Rebooted is the third season of the computer-animated television series Ninjago: Masters of Spinjitzu (titled Ninjago from the eleventh season onward). The series was created by Michael Hegner and Tommy Andreasen. The season aired from 29 January to 26 November 2014, following the second season titled Legacy of the Green Ninja. It is succeeded by the fourth season, titled Tournament of Elements.

The second season was originally intended to be the final season of the series due to the show and its associated Lego Ninjago product line having been planned as a three-year project. However, due to the strong performance of the television series and feedback from fans within online forums, it was continued with the release of Rebooted.

Although the season is titled Rebooted, it is a continuation of the storyline from the previous seasons, rather than a reboot. The season reintroduces Ninjago City with new advanced technology and features the return of the Overlord in digital form as the season's main antagonist. Rebooted is also the first season to introduce the nindroid character P.I.X.A.L. into the series.

Voice cast

Main 
 Jillian Michaels as Lloyd Garmadon, the Green Ninja
 Vincent Tong as Kai, the red ninja and Elemental Master of Fire
 Michael Adamthwaite as Jay, the blue ninja and Elemental Master of Lightning
 Brent Miller as Zane, the white ninja and Elemental Master of Ice
 Kirby Morrow as Cole, the black ninja and Elemental Master of Earth
 Kelly Metzger as Nya, Kai's sister
 Paul Dobson as Sensei Wu, the teacher of the ninja
 Mark Oliver as Sensei Garmadon
Jennifer Hayward as P.I.X.A.L. a female nindroid
 Kathleen Barr as Misako
Scott McNeil as the Digital Overlord/The Golden Master

Supporting 
 Lee Tockar as Cyrus Borg
 Alan Marriott as Dareth
Colin Murdock as Ed
Michael Dobson as Pythor P. Chumsworth
Richard Newman as General Cryptor
Ian James Corlett as Skales
 Kathleen Barr as Brad
 Alyssa Swales as Skales Jr.
 Michael Adamthwaite as Mindroid/Mailman
 Jillian Michaels as Fitz Donnegan

Production

Direction 
The Rebooted episodes were directed by Jens Møller, Martin Skov, Michael Helmuth Hansen, Peter Hausner and Trylle Vilstrup.

Animation 
The animation for the third season was produced at Wil Film ApS in Denmark.

Release 
The first two episodes of the season titled The Surge and The Art of the Silent Fist were released on Cartoon Network on 29 January 2014. The third and fourth episodes titled Blackout and The Curse of the Golden Master were not released until 16 April 2014. The second half of the season was released in July and November 2014. The episodes were also released in pairs with Enter the Digiverse and Codename: Arcturus being released on 13 July 2014, and The Void and The Titanium Ninja being released on 26 November of the same year.

Plot 
Since the defeat of the Overlord, Ninjago has been rebuilt into a futuristic metropolis, and renamed New Ninjago City. Cyrus Borg, founder and CEO of Borg Industries, has rebuilt the city with technological advancements. Without an enemy to fight, the ninja become teachers at Master Wu's Academy. One day, they receive clearance for a field trip to Borg Industries. Upon arrival, they meet a female android named P.I.X.A.L. The students convince Nya to take a "love" test, and it is revealed, to her shock and horror, that her perfect match is not Jay, but Cole. Cyrus Borg gives the ninja a golden statue as a gift, with the Techno Blades hidden inside. They ultimately learn that the Overlord has survived the final battle and is trapped inside the Digiverse as a computer virus. The Overlord takes control of Cyrus Borg and P.I.X.A.L. to create an army of Nindroids using Zane's blueprints. The Digital Overlord plans to capture Lloyd and use his Golden Power to escape the Digiverse, but the ninja are able to free P.I.X.A.L. from the Overlord's control. Meanwhile, Lloyd is trained by his father, Lord Garmadon. The ninja travel to the power station with the aim of using the Techno Blades to shut down the power, but are forced to fight an army of Nindroids, led by General Cryptor. 

After the power station is destroyed, a stranger steals the hard drive containing the Digital Overlord and uses electrocobrai to reactivate him. Wu is captured, transformed into a corrupted cyborg and attacks the ninja. They decide to go underground to find the Serpentine, who are now led by Skales, but the Serpentine are unable to help them defeat the Nindroids. Lloyd and Garmadon are attacked by corrupted Wu and Lloyd is captured. The Digital Overlord drains Lloyd of most of his Golden Power. The stranger is revealed to be Pythor, who survived the Great Devourer. Borg tells the ninja they can reboot the system and destroy the Digital Overlord by going into the Digiverse. They reboot the station by using the Golden Power and Lloyd escapes, but the Overlord manages to escape the digital realm half-formed. Lloyd then gives up his remaining Golden Power at the Temple of Light by restoring the elemental powers of the original four ninja. After Kai is captured by Pythor and the Nindroids, the ninja discover a rocket named Arcturus that the Digital Overlord intends to use to retrieve the Golden Weapons from space. After freeing Kai, they stow away on board the rocket and battle the Nindroids for the Golden Weapons but fail to obtain them when the Nindroids return to Ninjago.

The ninja return from space using elemental shields and prepare to confront the Digital Overlord, who has become the Golden Master, fulfilling an ancient Serpentine prophecy, and is now wreaking havoc on New Ninjago City. They try to shrink him with a shrinking pill, but this is thwarted by Pythor. With no other option, Zane sacrifices himself to destroy the Golden Master. However, Zane ultimately survives, trapped in Borg's systems, and rebuilds himself with the help of P.I.X.A.L.

Episodes

Ratings 
The third season of Ninjago: Masters of Spinjitzu continued the popularity of the preceding seasons and built on its ratings from the previous years. It consisted of four special events that aired throughout 2014, which averaged triple-digit viewer gains in the categories of children and all boys in comparison to the previous season. The January premiere ranked as the top telecast of the year on basic cable with boys 2-11 and boys 6-11.

Other media 
The season was accompanied by the release of associated video and app games. Lego Ninjago Rebooted, was released on 21 January 2014 and is an action game developed for iOS by The Lego Group. Lego Ninjago: Nindroids was released on 29 July 2014 for PlayStation Vita and was developed by Hellbent Games.

References

Primary

Secondary 

Rebooted
2014 Canadian television seasons
2014 Danish television seasons